The Howler is a family steel roller coaster at Holiday World & Splashin' Safari in Santa Claus, Indiana, United States. It was built in 1999 by Zamperla as part of a larger expansion project to build Holidog's FunTown; it opened on May 8, 1999. The Howler is themed after Holiday World's mascot, Holidog, and features a 12-passenger train with the front car resembling the dog's head and the back car resembling the dog's hind feet and tail.

The Howler is located within the Fourth of July section of Holiday World in a sub-section known as Holidog's FunTown, which is a children's play area located in the southeasternmost corner of the park.

Prior to the addition of Thunderbird in 2015, it was Holiday World's sole steel coaster, as the main roller coasters at the time were all wooden ones.

History
In 1998, Holiday World began making preparations for a new addition to the park by removing the Firecracker roller coaster from the area encircled by The Freedom Train. In its place, the park planned on building Holidog's FunTown, a children's play area featuring a three-story play structure. As part of Holidog's FunTown, Holiday World made plans to purchase a small roller coaster that all members of the family, including children, could enjoy. The park called the new roller coaster The Howler, deriving the name from the sound the area's mascot, a dog named Holidog, makes.

The Howler opened on May 8, 1999. When the roller coaster opened, it operated with a single 12-passenger train custom made by Zamperla so that the lead car resembled Holidog's head while the back car resembled Holidog's hind feet and tail.

Characteristics

Station
The Howler's station is fairly basic in comparison to the stations on Holiday World's other three roller coasters. The station is a covered platform with no walls. To enter, guests walk up a small set of stairs and enter a single queue switchback which stretches close to the length of the train. At the end of the queue there is a single swinging entrance gate. To the left of the entrance gate at the end of the station is a single swinging exit gate. The ride operator's controls are located in the area between the entrance and exit gates. To exit, guests may either walk down the small set of stairs or use the ramp. The ramp is also used by guests in wheelchairs to enter the station.

Train
The Howler uses a single light brown, 12-passenger train that is custom made by Zamperla to resemble Holidog. Each train is made up of six cars that hold 2 riders each. Each car has one row holding two riders. The Howler's safety restraints include a lap bar that is shared by the two riders in each row.

Track
The track on The Howler is made out of blue tubular steel. The supports for the track itself are steel as well. The track features a chain lift hill and two block sections, which only allows one train to operate at a time. The Howler uses fin brakes to allow the train to be stopped in the station at the conclusion of the ride.

Experience
The ride begins with riders in the station facing away from the Just for Pups play area. Immediately after dispatch the train latches onto the lift hill chain which takes riders  in the air. Once the train has reached the top of the lift hill it is released from the chain, at which point the train goes down the ride's initial drop, which curves slightly to the right. At the bottom of the drop the train goes back uphill. The train then makes a right, downhill turn to complete the ride's helix. After crossing under the ride's own track at the end of the helix, the train travels straight before making a banked right turn. At the conclusion of the turn, the train enters the station and stops. After stopping, the ride operators at Holiday World generally ask riders if they would like to go around for another cycle. If any rider objects to going around a second time, the ride operator lets that person off before resuming the second lap. At the conclusion of the second lap, the ride comes to an end at which point all riders unload. The total elapsed time for one lap is approximately twenty-five seconds.

References

External links
 Official website for The Howler at Holiday World & Splashin' Safari
 Official YouTube video of The Howler posted by Holiday World & Splashin' Safari

Roller coasters in Indiana
Holiday World & Splashin' Safari
Roller coasters introduced in 1999